Ministry of Foreign Affairs and International Cooperation may refer to:

 Ministry of Foreign Affairs and International Cooperation (Botswana)
 Ministry of Foreign Affairs and International Cooperation (Cambodia)
 Ministry of Foreign Affairs and International Cooperation (Djibouti)
 Ministry of Foreign Affairs and International Cooperation (Equatorial Guinea)
 Ministry of Foreign Affairs and International Cooperation (Fiji)
 Ministry of Foreign Affairs and International Cooperation (South Sudan)
 Ministry of Foreign Affairs and International Cooperation (Tanzania)
 Ministry of Foreign Affairs and International Cooperation (United Arab Emirates)